The 2013 Desert Diamond Cup was a soccer exhibition featuring four soccer teams from Major League Soccer, held between February 13–23, 2013. The preseason tournament was played at the Kino Sports Complex 11,000 seat main stadium in Tucson, Arizona. This was the 3rd annual Desert Diamond Cup.

Teams 
The following four clubs participated in the 2013 tournament:
New England Revolution (second appearance)
New York Red Bulls (third appearance)
Real Salt Lake (second appearance)
Seattle Sounders FC (first appearance)

Table standings

Matches
The tournament featured a round-robin group stage followed by third-place and championship matches.

Tournament

Third place match

Final

Final placement

References

External links 
 2013 FC Tucson Desert Diamond Cup

2013
Desert Diamond Cup